The Sydney SuperCats are a class of catamarans operated by Transdev Sydney Ferries on Sydney Harbour.

History

In 2000/01, the State Transit Authority purchased four SuperCats. Initially eight were ordered, but the final four were cancelled. All were built by Australian Defence Industries at Garden Island.

They primarily operate on Eastern Suburbs services and have on occasion been used on the Manly run. The upper deck is closed at night time.

In 2019 a new class of ferries known as the River-class were announced, with the new class to replace the SuperCats and HarbourCats. In December 2021 SuperCat Saint Mary Mackillop was retired from passenger service, after a few river-class ferries entered service from October 2021. On 31 August 2022 Susie O'Neill was retired. Today only Supercat 4 and Louise Sauvage remain in active service.

Vessels

See also
 List of Sydney Harbour ferries
 Timeline of Sydney Harbour ferries

References

External links

Catamarans
Ferry transport in Sydney
Ships built in New South Wales
Ferry classes